In the Japanese writing system,  are variant forms of hiragana.

History 

Hiragana, the main Japanese syllabic writing system, derived from cursive form of man'yōgana, a system where Chinese ideograms (kanji) were used to write sounds without regard to their meaning.  Originally, the same syllable (more precisely, mora) could be represented by several  more-or-less interchangeable kanji, or different cursive styles of the same kanji.  However, the 1900 script reform determined that only one specific character be used for each mora, with the rest being called hentaigana ("variant characters"). 

The 1900 standard included the hiragana ゐ, ゑ, and を, which historically stood for the phonetically distinct moras /wi/, /we/, and /wo/ but are currently pronounced as /i/, /e/, and /o/, identically to い, え, and お.  The を kana is still commonly used in the Japanese writing system, instead of お, for the direct object particle /-o/.  These characters were deprecated by the 1946 spelling reform. 

Hentaigana are still used occasionally today in some contexts, such as store signs and logos, to achieve "old-fashioned" or "traditional" look.

Katakana have variant forms, too. For example, (ネ) and (ヰ). However, katakana's variant forms are fewer than hiragana's ones. Katakana's choices of man'yōgana segments had stabilized early on and established – with few exceptions – an unambiguous phonemic orthography (one symbol per sound) long before the 1900 script regularization.

Standardized hentaigana 
Prior to the proposal which led to the inclusion of hentaigana in Unicode 10.0, they were already standardized into a list by Mojikiban, part of the Japanese Information-technology Promotion Agency (IPA).

To view hentaigana, special fonts need to be installed that support Hentaigana such as

 BabelStone Han
 IPA MJ Mincho Version 5.01 and later
 Hanazono Mincho
 Hanazono Mincho AFDKO
 UniHentaiKana
The glyph for example Hiragana wu (𛄟) also needs a special font to display such as

 Uraniwa Mincho X

Sources of hentaigana  
Hentaigana are adapted from the reduced and cursive forms of the following man’yōgana (kanji) characters. Source characters for the kana are not repeated below for hentaigana even when there are alternative glyphs; some uncertain.

In Unicode

286 hentaigana characters are included in the Unicode Standard in the Kana Supplement and Kana Extended-A blocks. One character was added to Unicode version 6.0 in 2010, 𛀁 (U+1B001 HIRAGANA LETTER ARCHAIC YE which has the formal alias HENTAIGANA LETTER E-1), and the remaining 285 hentaigana characters were added in Unicode version 10.0 in June 2017.

The Unicode block for Kana Supplement is U+1B000–U+1B0FF:

The Unicode block for Kana Extended-A is U+1B100–U+1B12F:

Development of the hiragana syllabic n

The hiragana syllabic n derives from a cursive form of the character 无, and originally signified , the same as む. This ambiguity has led to some modern expressions based on what are, in effect, spelling pronunciations.

Modern usage

Hentaigana are considered obsolete, but a few marginal uses remain. For example, otemoto (chopsticks), is written in hentaigana on some wrappers and many soba shops use hentaigana to spell kisoba on their signs. (See also: "Ye Olde" for "the old" on English signs.)

Hentaigana are used in some formal handwritten documents, particularly in certificates issued by classical Japanese cultural groups (e.g., martial art schools, etiquette schools, religious study groups, etc.). Also, they are occasionally used in reproductions of classic Japanese texts, akin to the use of blackletter in English and other Germanic languages to give an archaic flair. Modern poems may be composed and printed in hentaigana for visual effect.

However, most Japanese people are unable to read hentaigana nowadays, only recognizing a few from their common use in shop signs, or figuring them out from context.

Gallery
Some of the following hentaigana are cursive forms of the same kanji as their standard hiragana counterparts, but simplified differently. Others descend from unrelated kanji that represent the same sound.

See also
 Furigana
 Romaji

Notes

References

External links

 Chart of hentaigana calligraphy from O'Neill's A Reader of Handwritten Japanese 
 A chart of hentaigana hosted by Jim Breen of the WWWJDIC
 Chart of kana from Engelbert Kaempfer circa 1693
 Hentaigana on signs 
 L2/15-239 Proposal for Japanese HENTAIGANA - Unicode

Kana
Japanese writing system